Mały Powstaniec (the Little Insurrectionist) is a statue in commemoration of the child soldiers who fought and died during the Warsaw Uprising of 1944.  It is located on Podwale Street, Warsaw, Poland, next to the ramparts of Warsaw's Old Town.

The statue is of a young boy wearing a helmet too large for his head and holding a submachine gun.  Despite being sometimes colloquially called Antek Rozpylacz, it is not representing any specific child. The helmet and submachine gun are stylized after German equipment, which was captured during the uprising and used by the resistance fighters against the occupying forces.

Jerzy Jarnuszkiewicz created the design in 1946 and it was used for years for producing small statuettes, only to become the monument decades later. Polish scouts gathered the entirety of funds for the statue and it was unveiled on 1 October 1983 by Professor Jerzy Świderski – a cardiologist who during the uprising was a 14-years-old courier (pseudonym: "Lubicz") serving in the "Gustaw" regiment of the Home Army. Behind the statue is a plaque with the engraved words of "Warszawskie Dzieci" ("Varsovian Children"), a popular song from the period: "Warszawskie dzieci, pójdziemy w bój - za każdy kamień twój, stolico damy krew" ("Varsovian children, we'll head into battle—for every stone of yours, we shall give our blood").

Gallery

See also
 Warsaw Uprising
 Home Army
 Polish resistance movement in World War II
 Warsaw Uprising Museum
 Warsaw Insurgents Cemetery
 
 Military use of children

References

1983 establishments in Poland
1983 sculptures
Child soldiers in World War II
Monuments and memorials in Warsaw
Sculptures of children
Warsaw Uprising
World War II monuments and memorials in Poland